Frank Shaver Allen (1860–1930), usually known as F. S. Allen was a significant Joliet, Illinois-based American architect noted for his Richardsonian Romanesque school designs.

Early life and career
Frank Shaver Allen was born in 1860 in Galesburg, Illinois, to Sheldon W. and Nancy A. (Shaver) Allen. He seems to have received some training in Chicago. By 1880 he was practicing architecture in Streator, Illinois. In 1886 Allen formed a partnership with John H. Coxhead, the firm being Allen & Coxhead. The partnership was dissolved the following year when Coxhead relocated to St. Paul, Minnesota. Following the dissolution of this partnership Allen moved to Joliet, where he did much of his best-known work.

In 1893 an exhibit of his work in school architecture at the World's Columbian Exposition received an award from the exposition commission, which led to significant expansion of his practice.

After being commissioned for work in California, he moved to Los Angeles in 1904 with his family, settling in Pasadena. He originally maintained his practice from Pasadena, but moved it to Los Angeles in 1907.

Allen was also an Egyptologist.

Alleged kidnapping incident, retirement and death
Allen was arrested for having an Altadena boy in his Los Angeles hotel room. The Los Angeles Times wrote that: "The boy, in whose company he was when arrested, is the same who was reported missing some time ago. No trace of him could be found by the police until he walked into his home in Altadena with the explanation that he had been in San Francisco with Allen. The matter was reported to the District Attorney's office, and an investigation was begun which resulted in last night's arrests. Allen is one of the most prominent architects in Southern California. He has been reckoned as a leader in his profession in this end of the State, and has occupied a high position in society. His family is of the most exclusive in the fashionable circles of Pasadena and Altadena." By early the next year, the felony charge was dropped. The Los Angeles Times reported that "The felony charge against F. S. Allen, a Pasadena architect, was ordered dismissed on motion of Deputy District Attorney Harry Alexander, on the ground it would be impossible to secure sufficient evidence to convict Allen."

Though other details of this incident are not known, it likely hastened the end of Allen's architectural career, who retired in 1915. He later operated a music store. He died in California on August 26, 1930.

Legacy
Allen was responsible for a number of buildings that have been listed on the United States National Register of Historic Places.

Architectural works

External links
 Frank Shaver Allen website

References

1860 births
1930 deaths
American Egyptologists
People from Joliet, Illinois
Architects from Illinois
Architects from California